Cathal Sheridan may refer to:
 Cathal Sheridan (dual player), Irish player of Gaelic football and hurling
 Cathal Sheridan (rugby union), Irish rugby union player